{{DISPLAYTITLE:C7H14O2}}
The molecular formula C7H14O2 may refer to:

 Amyl acetate
 sec-Amyl acetate
 n-Butyl glycidyl ether
 Butyl propionate
 n-Butyl propionate
 sec-Butyl propionate
 Isobutyl propionate
 tert-Butyl propionate
 Ethyl isovalerate
 Ethyl pentanoate
 Heptanoic acid
 Isoamyl acetate
 Methyl hexanoate